"Good Lovin is a song written by Rudy Clark and Arthur Resnick that was a #1 hit single for the Young Rascals in 1966.

Original version
The song was first recorded by Lemme B. Good (stage name of singer Limmie Snell) in March 1965 and written by Rudy Clark. The following month it was recorded with different lyrics by R&B artists The Olympics, produced by Jerry Ragovoy; this version reached #81 on the Billboard Pop Singles chart.

The Young Rascals' version
The tale has been told that Rascal Felix Cavaliere heard The Olympics' recording on a New York City radio station and the group added it to their concert repertoire, using the same lyrics and virtually the same arrangement as The Olympics' version.  Co-producer Tom Dowd captured this live feel on their 1966 recording, even though the group did not think the performance held together well. "Good Lovin rose to the top of the Billboard Pop Singles chart in the spring of 1966 and represented the Young Rascals' first real hit.

"Good Lovin is one of The Rock and Roll Hall of Fame's 500 Songs that Shaped Rock and Roll, and was ranked #333 on Rolling Stone's 500 Greatest Songs of All Time list.  Writer Dave Marsh placed it at #108 in his 1989 book The Heart of Rock and Soul: The 1001 Greatest Singles Ever Made, saying it is "the greatest example ever of a remake surpassing the quality of an original without changing a thing about the arrangement."

Other versions

British group Brian Poole and the Tremeloes released their version in 1965, before the Young Rascals single. In June 1965, The Who recorded a live version for the radio program Top Gear.

Tommy James and the Shondells released a version on their 1966 album Hanky Panky.

Gilberto Cruz Sextet covered the song for their LP The Groovy Sounds, the first LP recorded by Cotique Records, a label founded by George Goldner for salsa music, soul and funk.

The Residents recorded a cover of the song for the album The Third Reich 'n Roll as a part of "Hitler was a Vegetarian".

Mary Wells included her version of the song on her 1966 album The Two Sides of Mary Wells.

"Good Lovin was the title song of a 2008 album by Australian singer David Campbell.

A popular version was by the Grateful Dead, who made it a workhorse of their concert rotation, appearing almost every year from 1969 on.  It was sung in their early years during the 1960s by Ron "Pigpen" McKernan and later by Bob Weir.  The Weir rendition was recorded for the group's 1978 Shakedown Street album and came in for a good amount of criticism: Rolling Stone said it "feature[d] aimless ensemble work and vocals that Bob Weir should never have attempted." On November 11, 1978, the Grateful Dead performed it on Saturday Night Live.

John Paul Young covered the song on his album The Singer (1981).

Bobby McFerrin recorded a version for his Simple Pleasures album in 1988.

Bruce Springsteen performed a version in 2009 at the London Calling: Live in Hyde Park concert.

Film and television appearances

The Rascals' "Good Lovin was used in 1983 the film The Big Chill.  The false ending was used for dramatic effect, in which the character Chloe says about the character who committed suicide, while the song is playing in the background..

A cover of the song "Good Lovin was used in 1988 the film Salsa.

On the May 21, 2018, episode of reality television singing competition show The Voice, Team Alicia (Keys) member Britton Buchanan performed the song as his cover performance during the finale.  His performance charted in the top ten on iTunes and contributed to his second-place finish behind Team Kelly (Clarkson) finalist Brynn Cartelli.

References

1965 singles
1966 singles
Songs written by Rudy Clark
Songs written by Artie Resnick
The Olympics (band) songs
The Rascals songs
Grateful Dead songs
Tommy James and the Shondells songs
Hanson (band) songs
Song recordings produced by Arif Mardin
Song recordings produced by Tom Dowd
Billboard Hot 100 number-one singles
Cashbox number-one singles
RPM Top Singles number-one singles
Atlantic Records singles
Decca Records singles
1965 songs